Felipe Albuquerque Felippi (born 27 September 1999), commonly known as Felipe Albuquerque, is a Brazilian professional footballer who plays as a right-back for Campeonato Brasileiro Série B club Ponte Preta, on loan from Grêmio.
Atualmente está no Novorizontino, pela serie B 2022

Club career

Grêmio
Born in Nova Andradina, Mato Grosso do Sul, Felipe Albuquerque joined the Grêmio's Academy at the age of 14 in 2014.

Career statistics

Club

Honours
Grêmio
Copa CONMEBOL Libertadores: 2017
CONMEBOL Recopa Sudamericana: 2018
Campeonato Gaúcho: 2018, 2019, 2020, 2022

References

External links

Profile at the Grêmio F.B.P.A. website

1999 births
Living people
Sportspeople from Mato Grosso do Sul
Brazilian footballers
Association football defenders
Campeonato Brasileiro Série A players
Campeonato Brasileiro Série B players
Grêmio Foot-Ball Porto Alegrense players
Grêmio Esportivo Brasil players
Associação Atlética Ponte Preta players